The Norway national junior handball team is the national under-20 handball team of Norway. Controlled by the Norwegian Handball Federation, it represents Norway in international matches.

History
The slower development of men's handball in Norway is reflected in the fact that the Scandinavian nation have rarely managed to break into the top 10 positions at the IHF Men's Junior World Championship. The clear best result was fourth place in 1995. Aside from that ranking, Norway have only placed in the top 10 Four other times – the last being in 2019.

Statistics

IHF Junior World Championship record
 Champions   Runners up   Third place   Fourth place

EHF European Junior Championship 
 Champions   Runners up   Third place   Fourth place

References

External links
World Men's Youth Championship table
European Men's Youth Championship table

Handball in Norway
Men's national junior handball teams
Handball